Zoi Harris (born May 4, 1995), better known by her stage name Jean Deaux is an American artist, musician and filmmaker. She is known for her mastery of multiple genres and creative mediums. Her debut EP Krash was released in October 19, 2018.

Musical career
Deaux has appeared on tracks by other artists including Smino, Saba, Mick Jenkins, and Isaiah Rashad. She has noted Missy Elliott as one of her inspirations. Jean Deaux is a stage name inspired by the line 'that's John Doe' in a track by Rick Ross which she previously used as a Twitter handle before adopting it as a stage name. She is part of the hip hop collective The Village 777 with Alex Wiley, Monster Mike, Isaiah Rashad, Spiff, and The Magician. She is also part of the musical collective Medicine Woman with Ravyn Lenae, Drea Smith, and Via Rosa.

In 2017 she released a track titled Wikipedia, telling HotNewHipHop that "People are going to try and tell you who you are every step of the way, they'll even knock you down to convince you. But you get stronger every time you get up on your feet". The lead single Way Out from the Krash EP was positively reviewed by Pitchfork. The EP received positive reviews from Rolling Out, DJBooth and Chicago Reader. NPR listed Deaux as one of 20 'artists to watch' in 2019.

Discography

Extended plays

Singles

As lead artist

Guest appearances

References

1995 births
Living people
Singers from Chicago
American women artists
American women singers
21st-century African-American women singers